The 2007 Astro Wah Lai Toi Drama Awards, presented by Astro in Malaysia, was an awards ceremony that recognised the best Hong Kong television programmes that had aired on Malaysia's Astro Wah Lai Toi in 2007. The ceremony was televised live on Astro's Cantonese channel, Astro Wah Lai Toi.

The ceremony took place on 26 January 2008 at the Sunway Pyramid in Kuala Lumpur, Malaysia. Winners were 100% based on results through popular voting, which commenced on 17 December 2007.

Winners and nominees
Top five nominees are in bold.

References

TVB original programming
2007 television awards
2007 in Malaysian television
2007 in Hong Kong television